Daniel B. Abel (born May 11, 1961) is a retired United States Coast Guard vice admiral who last served as Deputy Commandant for Operations from June 2018 to June 2020. He previously served as deputy director of operations of the United States Southern Command.

References

Living people
United States Coast Guard Academy alumni
College of William & Mary alumni
Dwight D. Eisenhower School for National Security and Resource Strategy alumni
Recipients of the Defense Superior Service Medal
Recipients of the Legion of Merit
United States Coast Guard admirals
1961 births